The Nikon Coolpix P90 was launched by Nikon on 3 February 2009 as an improved version of the Nikon Coolpix P80. It is a 12-megapixel CCD digital camera with a fixed 24× zoom lens giving more than twelve times image magnification fully extended.

A year later in March 2010, the camera was replaced by the P100 model. The notable improvement in the P100 is the use of a CMOS image sensor with claimed better light sensitivity and less noise, but with a lower 10 MP resolution.

Features
It is a 12-megapixel CCD digital camera with a fixed 24× zoom Nikkor ED glass lens giving more than twelve times image magnification fully extended.

Vibration reduction (VR) image stabilisation.

The camera has a three-inch (76 mm)  LCD display that may be folded 45 degrees downward and 90 degrees upward to facilitate shooting above-the-head or low-to-the ground images as well as traditional waist-level and eye-level viewing. The electronic eyelevel viewfinder has the same resolution as the LCD display.

Most of the features otherwise are carried over from the P80 model.

References

External links

  Nikon Coolpix P90 Review

Superzoom cameras
P0090
Cameras introduced in 2009